Louis Ignacio-Pinto (born June 21, 1903 in Porto-Novo, Benin, and died May 24, 1984 in Dourdan, France) was a politician from Benin who served in the French Senate from 1947 to 1955.From 1961 to 1967 he was a first permanent representative to United Nations and ambassador to the USA. From 1967 to 1970 chief justice of Supreme Court of Dahomey.

References 
 page on the French Senate website

Beninese politicians
French Senators of the Fourth Republic
People from Porto-Novo
1903 births
1984 deaths
Senators of French West Africa
International Court of Justice judges
Beninese expatriates in France
Beninese expatriates in the United States